The Milwaukee County Federated Library System (MCFLS) is a public library organization that coordinates activities between its member public libraries, which collectively serve the Milwaukee metropolitan area.  It is governed by a board of trustees and funded by the State of Wisconsin and each member library.

Purpose
The MCFLS provides a number of useful services to any person who is a member of one of its libraries.  These services allow the person to use any member library as if they belonged to it, such as searching all libraries' collection through a common catalog system, checking out any library's materials through the internet, and requesting them to be delivered to a closer library.  The MCFLS also provides administration services to each of its member libraries, such as assisting with technical upgrades, submitting annual reports, purchasing subscription database services, and providing continuing education opportunities.

Member Libraries
Membership in the MCFLS consists of the following public libraries in Milwaukee County:
Milwaukee Public Library, which maintains the following branch libraries throughout the city of Milwaukee in addition to its Central Library location:
Atkinson
Bay View
Capitol
Center Street
East
Martin Luther King
Mill Road
Mitchell Street
MPL Express at Silver Spring
Tippecanoe
Villard Square
Washington Park
Zablocki
Brown Deer Public Library
Cudahy Family Library
Franklin Public Library
Greendale Public Library
Greenfield Public Library
Hales Corners Public Library
North Shore Library (serving Bayside, Fox Point, Glendale, and River Hills)
Oak Creek Public Library
St. Francis Public Library
Shorewood Public Library
South Milwaukee Public Library
Wauwatosa Public Library
West Allis Public Library
Whitefish Bay Public Library

References

External links
Milwaukee County Federated Library System

County library systems in Wisconsin
Public libraries in Wisconsin
Education in Milwaukee County, Wisconsin